Comesperma virgatum, commonly known as milkwort,   is a herb in the family Polygalaceae. It is an erect slender herb growing to between 30 cm and 1.6 m high, on sandy and lateritic soils, and sometimes in swampy conditions. Its pink to purple flowers may be seen from September to December or January to March. 

The species was first formally described by French botanist Jacques Labillardière in Novae Hollandiae Plantarum Specimen in 1806, from a specimen collected in Van Leuwin's Land.

The species occurs in Western Australia.

References

External links
Comesperma virgatum occurrence data from Australasian Virtual Herbarium

virgatum

Flora of Western Australia
Plants described in 1806